Michael Rush is the name of:

 Michael Rush (museum director) (1949–2015), American art museum director
 Michael Rush (rower) (1844–1922), Irish Australian sculler
 Mike Rush, Democratic member of the Massachusetts Senate